Zoila Rosa Stewart Lee (born 1 November 1968) is a retired Costa Rican sprinter who competed primarily in the 400 metres. She represented her country at two Olympic Games, in 1992 and 1996, as well as four World Championships. In addition she won the silver medal at the 1993 Central American and Caribbean Games and multiple medals at Central American Games.

She still holds national records in several events including the outdoor 100 and 400 metres.

Her sister, Maureen Stewart, is also a former Olympic athlete.

Competition record

Personal bests
Outdoor
100 metres – 11.72 (Xalapa 1990) NR
200 metres – 23.92 (Ponce 1993)
400 metres – 52.57 (Ponce 1993) NR

Indoor
200 metres – 24.87 (Lincoln 1998) NR
400 metres – 56.43 (Lincoln 1998) NR

References

1968 births
Living people
Costa Rican female sprinters
Athletes (track and field) at the 1987 Pan American Games
Athletes (track and field) at the 1991 Pan American Games
Athletes (track and field) at the 1992 Summer Olympics
Athletes (track and field) at the 1996 Summer Olympics
Athletes (track and field) at the 1999 Pan American Games
Olympic athletes of Costa Rica
World Athletics Championships athletes for Costa Rica
Pan American Games competitors for Costa Rica
Competitors at the 1993 Central American and Caribbean Games
Central American and Caribbean Games silver medalists for Costa Rica
Central American Games gold medalists for Costa Rica
Central American Games medalists in athletics
Central American Games silver medalists for Costa Rica
Central American and Caribbean Games medalists in athletics
Olympic female sprinters